Ester Wier (October 17, 1910 – January 6, 2000) was an American writer.

She was born Esther Catherine Wier to Robert A. and Lydia (née Harshberger) Alberti in Seattle, Washington. She married Henry Robert Wier, a naval officer, in 1934, Her first books used her experiences traveling as a naval wife. She took a workshop at George Washington University which led to her writing for children.

Bibliography

 Answer Book on Naval Social Customs, 1956 (with Dorothy Coffin Hickey)
 Answer Book on Air Force Social Customs, 1957
 Army Social Customs, 1958
 What Every Air Force Wife Should Know, 1958
 The Loner, 1963 
 Gift of the Mountains, 1963 
 The Rumptydoolers, 1964 
 Easy Does It, 1965 
 The Barrel, 1966 
 The Space Hut, 1967 
 The Wind Chasers, 1967 
 Action at Paradise Marsh, 1968 
 The Winners, 1968 
 The Long Year, 1969 
The Straggler: Adventures of a Sea Bird, 1970
 The White Oak, 1971 
 The Partners, 1972
 The Hunting Trail, 1974
 King of the Mountain, 1975

References

External links

Archival collections relating to Ester Wier

American children's writers
Newbery Honor winners
1910 births
2000 deaths